The Keelung City Government (KLCG) is the municipal government of Keelung, Taiwan.

Organization

 Chief Secretary
 Department of Civil Affairs
 Department of Finance
 Department of Economic Affairs
 Department of Education
 Department of Public Works
 Department of Transportation and Tourism
 Department of Urban Development
 Department of Social Affairs
 Department of Land Administration
 Department of General Affairs
 Department of Research and Evaluation
 Department of Personnel
 Department of Civil Service Ethics
 Department of Budget, Accounting and Statistics
 Senior Consumer Ombudsman Officer
 Police Bureau
 Keelung City Fire Department
 Health Bureau
 Municipal Hospital
 Public District Health Center
 Chronic Disease Bureau
 Cultural Affairs Bureau
 Environmental Protection Bureau
 Revenue Service Bureau
 Keelung City Bus Management Office
 District Office
 Zhongzheng District Office
 Xinyi District Office
 Ren'ai District Office
 Zhongshan District Office
 Anle District Office
 Nuannuan District Office
 Qidu District Office
 Household Registration Office
 Land Office
 Anle Land Office
 Xinyi Land Office
 Ren'ai Senior Citizen's Home
 Municipal Stadium
 Mortuary Services Office
 Public Market
 Municipal Nursery
 Junior High School
 Elementary School
 Municipal Kindergarten

Access
Keelung City Hall is accessible within walking distance east from Keelung Station of Taiwan Railways.

See also
 Keelung City Council

References

External links

 

Keelung
Local governments of the Republic of China